The 1982 Men's Asian Games Volleyball Tournament was held in New Delhi, India from 20 November to 3 December 1982.

Results

Preliminary round

Pool A

Pool B

Pool C

Pool D

Classification 13th–15th

Classification 9th–12th

Classification 5th–8th

Final round

Final standing

References

External links
OCA official website

Men's Volleyball